Oghi may refer to:

 Oghi, Pakistan, a town in Pakistan
 Oghi Tehsil, the larger administrative unit
 Oghi (drink), an Armenian alcoholic beverage